The Brunnisach is a river in Baden-Württemberg, Germany. It flows into Lake Constance, which is drained by the Rhine, near Friedrichshafen.

See also
List of rivers of Baden-Württemberg

References

Rivers of Baden-Württemberg
Rivers of Germany